Metro is an Icelandic fast food restaurant chain. It replaced McDonald's after McDonald's left Iceland on 30 October 2009, as a result of the 2008–2011 Icelandic financial crisis and high import tariff on imported ingredients which requires their prices of their products to increase, which the franchise holder, Lyst Hr., refused to do in order to stay competitive with local restaurants who used ingredients sourced locally. The franchise owner decided to close down all McDonald's operation and replaced with their own franchise, Metro.

In contrast with McDonald's, Metro uses the cheaper locally supplied ingredients which can allow the product to sell for lower price. Some original McDonald's menu items are on the Metro menu along with domestic products, with menu items previously used on McDonald's now translated to the Icelandic language.

History

McDonald's Iceland (1993-2009) 

McDonald's opened its first Icelandic restaurant in Reykjavík in 1993 in response to the rising wealth of Icelandic residents. The then prime minister of Iceland, Davíð Oddsson became the first Icelandic customer to order the Big Mac. Prior to 2004, McDonald's relied on locally supplied meat from Iceland. However, following the shortages of the local meats, McDonald's relied on imported meats, especially from Germany, which continued until the closure of McDonald's Iceland.

However, in 2008, Iceland suffered a financial crisis which caused the Icelandic krona to weaken. It then coupled with the high import tariff imposed on the imported goods causing the cost of imports for the key ingredients to increase, especially a kilogram of onion from Germany which costs the equivalent to a bottle of whisky, making the Big Mac price in Iceland to rise 20 percent from 650 krona (US$5.29) to 780 krona (US$6.36) thus becoming the most expensive Big Mac ever sold in 2009, surpassing the price of Big Mac sold in Switzerland and Norway (US$5.75). Due to this situation, the managing director of Lyst Hr., who managed the franchising of McDonald's in Iceland, Magnus Ogmundsson, decided that it was not worth raising the price of their products in order to stay competitive with other restaurants which used the locally sourced ingredients. Hence it was decided to close all the stores in Iceland in October 2009, with no plans to revive McDonald's Iceland in the future. When the closure was announced on 26 October 2009, many concerned customers rushed to McDonald's to get the last-minute opportunity to have a meal at McDonald's. This caused the sales of McDonald's to spike, where more than 10,000 burgers were sold in a day, and a shortages of staff to handle the large number of customers. The Big Mac was sold out on 29 October 2009. The last McDonald's branch was closed on 30 October 2009. By the time of the closure, one burger costs 230 krona (US$1.87). The last order for McDonald's burger and french fries was sold to an individual who offered to donate these foods to National Museum of Iceland. The gifts were rejected by the museum curator and were later transferred to one of the hostels in South Iceland for exhibition.

Metro (2009–present) 
After the closure, Lyst Hr., reopened all former McDonald's branches in Iceland under the new brand, Metro, on 1 November 2009. The new operation used locally sourced ingredients which were much cheaper than imported ingredients, and retain 90 employees who previously worked in McDonald's prior to closure, while creating additional 15 job openings available to Icelanders. It also retains some of the original McDonald's menu items in Metro's food menu in additions to domestic products. However, its original McDonald's menu items used in Metro are translated to Icelandic language.

In June 2010, Lyst Hr. sold Metro to another company, Lífs og heilsu ehf., before Lyst Hr. declared bankruptcy. While the sale of the subsidiary excluded the debts from previous parent company, the new parent company, Lífs og heilsu ehf., hoped that since the acquisition of Metro, the company will help settle Lyst Hr.'s debt in full. However, the rising debts of the new parent company, Lífs og heilsu ehf., caused the parent company itself to declare bankruptcy, Lífs og heilsu ehf. sold Metro to M-Veitingar ehf. in January 2013.

In May 2015, due to strikes at Icelandic Veterinary Association, many Icelandic restaurants were affected by meat shortages which included Metro and KFC. As a result, Metro temporarily replaced beef with pork in their hamburger.

Products 

Metro predominantly sells hamburgers, French fries, grilled chicken, chicken nuggets, salads and wraps. The chain also has sides like mozzarella sticks, soft drinks, milkshakes, and fruit.

Metro's flagship product, Heimsborgari, is a hamburger that is equivalent to the McDonald's Big Mac.

Since 2011, the menu has been revamped to meet the needs of health-conscious customers, as well as the regular customers. The revamped menu includes a new salad range such as Caesar salad and haystack, and the introduction of naan as a choice for wraps. In addition, Metro shows customers the calories of all food items offered.

Despite the company's commitment to use the locally supplied ingredients and materials such as vegetables and meats, some ingredients such as breads, cheese and naan are imported from overseas instead.

Restaurant 
As of 2019, the company operates two branches in Iceland, one in Skeifan and another one in Smáratorg. Similar to McDonald's, it offers drive-through service, indoor seating and playground.

Reception 
On the first day of the opening of the Metro restaurant, the reception was quite positive, where many customers had been queuing up during the opening and also unusually high numbers of drivers queued at the drive thru section placing orders. In addition, due to the company's ability to decide the pricing for the products, as well as offering healthier food choices to health-conscious customers, Metro's business has been slightly improved.

See also 

 McDonald's
 List of countries with McDonald's franchises
 List of restaurants in Iceland
 Vkusno i tochka, a similar chain of McDonald's replacements in Russia.

References

External links 
Official website 

Restaurants in Iceland
Restaurants established in 2009
Fast-food franchises
Fast-food hamburger restaurants
Fast-food restaurants
Restaurant chains in Iceland